East Salem is an unincorporated community and census-designated place in Delaware Township, Juniata County, Pennsylvania, United States. As of the 2010 census, the population was 186.

Demographics

References

External links

Census-designated places in Juniata County, Pennsylvania
Census-designated places in Pennsylvania